Banendra Mushahary is a Bharatiya Janata Party politician from Assam. He was elected in Assam Legislative Assembly election in 1996 to 2001 and 2011 from Gauripur constituency. He was also member of Asom Gana Parishad.

He Joined Bharatiya Janata Party On 29 December 2020.

References 

Living people
Asom Gana Parishad politicians
Bodoland People's Front politicians
Members of the Assam Legislative Assembly
People from Dhubri district
Year of birth missing (living people)